The Turkish Confederation of Businessmen and Industrialists, best known by the abbreviation TUSKON, was an employers' organization in Turkey, with about 40,000 members. It was founded in 2005 by seven business federations. Ninety percent of the TUSKON members were small or medium establishments with fewer than 50 employees. TUSKON engaged in lobbying all decision-makers at the local, regional, national and global levels. Rızanur Meral, the managing director of SANKO Automotive Group, was the last president of TUSKON.

TUSKON was closely connected to the Islamic Gülen movement of the Turkish preacher Fethullah Gülen. The movement controlled many businesses and organizations around the world, with many of their leaders having membership in TUSKON, such as Bank Asya. TUSKON was closed following the coup attempt in July 2016.

See also 

 Turkish Industry and Business Association (TÜSİAD)
 Gülen movement
 Bank Asya

References

External links

2005 establishments in Turkey
2016 disestablishments in Turkey
Employers' organizations
Business organizations based in Turkey
Gülen movement
Organizations established in 2005
Organizations disestablished in 2016
Defunct organizations based in Turkey